SCR, or scr, may refer to:

Organizations
 Sacred Congregation of Rites, a former Congregation of the Roman Curia
 Senior common room of a higher education institution
 South Coast Repertory, theatre located in Costa Mesa, California
 BBC Southern Counties Radio, a former radio service
 Sport Club do Recife, a Brazilian soccer team
 Success case replication, a methodology claiming to identify, verify, and multiply successful enterprises
 Supreme Court Reports (Canada)
 Supreme Court Reports (India)
South Central Railway zone, one of the  zones of Indian Railways

Science and technology
 Selective catalytic reduction, a technology for control of NOX emissions in furnace flue gas and internal combustion engine exhaust
 Self-consistent renormalization, a theory for magnetic materials also used in high temperature superconductivity
 Short circuit ratio, a measure of stability characteristics
 Silicon controlled rectifier, a type of thyristor
 Skin conductance response
 Space charge region, of a semiconductor device
 Steel catenary riser, a type of pipe used in offshore oil rigs
 Summary Care Record, a UK NHS electronic patient record
 Supply chain resilience
 Satellite channel router
 .scr, a file extension used for Microsoft Windows screensavers
 .scr, a file extension used for script files by EAGLE
 Screener (promotional), a movie piracy rip, a motion picture film transfer process identifier
 Semi-closed circuit rebreather, a type of rebreather breathing apparatus for scuba diving
 Signal Corps Radio or Set, Complete, Radio, U.S. Army Signal Corps designation
 Studio control room, also known as production control room or gallery that manages television studio productions
 Sustainable cell rate, a parameter of a traffic contract

Transport
 Ruf SCR, a sports car manufactured by German automobile manufacturer Ruf Automobile
 SCR, the IATA code for Scandinavian Mountains Airport, Dalarna, Sweden
 SCR, the National Rail code for St Columb Road railway station, Cornwall, UK
 Smyrna Cassaba Railway, an Ottoman railway
 South Central Railway in India
 South Coast Rail, a future MBTA Commuter Rail line
 South Cross Route, the designation for the southern section of Ringway 1, the innermost circuit of the London Ringways network
 Suez Canal Route, an international ocean trade route
 Sydney Coal Railway, a Canadian short-line railway operating in the eastern part of Cape Breton County, Nova Scotia

Other uses
 Solvency Capital Requirement, in Solvency II
 Science and Consciousness Review, a website presenting publicly accessible summaries of scientific studies of consciousness and related issues
 Salford City Reds, former name of Salford Red Devils, an English Rugby League team
 Seabird Colony Register, a British database of birds
 Senate concurrent resolution
 Seychellois rupee (ISO 4217 code), the currency of Seychelles
 Slot car racing a hobby which involves electric model car racing on tracks
 Supreme Court Review, a peer-edited law review in the US.
 FightLite SCR, a firearm whose lower receiver is generally compatible with AR-15 upper receivers.

See also